Theater Viel Lärm um Nichts is a theatre in Munich, Bavaria, Germany.

See also Theater Viel Lärm um Nichts as a part of Pasinger Fabrik. 

Theatres in Munich